ECOS is an Australian environmental magazine which presents articles on sustainability research and issues from across Australia and the Asia Pacific region, published monthly online by CSIRO.

History and profile
ECOS was founded in 1974. The magazine won the Banksia Award for Communication in 2000. Until May June 2011 the magazine was also printed.

References

External links
 

1974 establishments in Australia
2011 disestablishments in Australia
Bi-monthly magazines published in Australia
CSIRO
Defunct magazines published in Australia
Environmental magazines
Magazines established in 1974
Magazines disestablished in 2011
Online magazines with defunct print editions